Fuchiba is a genus of African araneomorph spiders in the family Trachelidae, first described by C. R. Haddad & R. Lyle in 2008.

Species
 it contains six species:
Fuchiba aquilonia Haddad & Lyle, 2008 (type) – Botswana, Mozambique, South Africa
Fuchiba capensis Haddad & Lyle, 2008 – South Africa
Fuchiba montana Haddad & Lyle, 2008 – South Africa, Lesotho
Fuchiba similis Haddad & Lyle, 2008 – South Africa
Fuchiba tortilis Haddad & Lyle, 2008 – South Africa
Fuchiba venteri Haddad & Lyle, 2008 – South Africa

References

Araneomorphae genera
Trachelidae